Lammot du Pont Copeland (May 19, 1905 – July 1, 1983) was an American businessman.

Early life
Copeland was the great-great-grandson of DuPont's founder, Eleuthère Irénée du Pont, and he served as the company's 11th president from 1962 to 1967. His parents were Charles Copeland (March 30, 1867 in Englewood, New Jersey – February 3, 1944) and Louisa d'Andelot du Pont (January 25, 1868 in New Castle County, Delaware – August 10, 1926), who were married on February 16, 1904, at St. Amour in Wilmington, Delaware.

Career
He appeared on the cover of TIME magazine on November 27, 1964.

In 1962, Copeland established the Andelot Fellowships at the University of Delaware. Together with Hugh Moore and William Henry Draper Jr., Copeland founded the Population Crisis Committee in 1965 (now "Population Action International") as a lobbying organization for government involvement in population control.

Copeland was elected to the American Philosophical Society in 1978. 

Copeland also had his portrait painted by artist Salvador Dalí.

Personal life
He married Pamela Cunnigham (May 5, 1906 – January 25, 2001) on February 1, 1930, at Litchfield, Connecticut. She was the daughter of Mr. & Mrs. Seymour Cunningham of Litchfield. The Copelands had three children: Bouchaine Vineyards winery owner Gerret van Sweringen Copeland, Hollywood Citizen News and San Fernando Valley Valley Times owner Lammot du Pont Copeland Jr., and daughter Louisa du Pont Copeland, who married James Biddle. Grandchildren: Lammot duPont Copeland, III (January 31, 1961 - May 31, 2020).

References

External links 
DuPont Heritage: Lammot du Pont Copeland
Pamela C. and Lammot du Pont Copeland family photographs (1810–1994) at Hagley Museum and Library
Copeland family papers  at Hagley Museum and Library

1905 births
1983 deaths
20th-century American businesspeople
Du Pont family
People from New Castle County, Delaware

Members of the American Philosophical Society
Harvard College alumni